Matthew Jeffrey Allen Whiley (born 6 May 1980) is a former English cricketer.  Whiley was a right-handed batsman who bowled left-arm fast-medium.  He played for Nottinghamshire and Leicestershire during a five-year first-class career.

The Nottingham native, who has one Youth Test match, made his County Championship debut in the 1998 season, though he mostly appeared for the second team between then and 2001. Whiley started appearing more commonly for Leicestershire in April 2001, the season after their promotion from Division Two of the County Championship. He stayed with the first team until 2003, when Leicestershire were relegated and subsequently had a mass-clearout.  Whiley was a tail-ending batsman for both his county sides.

References

External links
Matthew Whiley at ESPNcricinfo
Matthew Whiley at CricketArchive

1980 births
Living people
Cricketers from Nottingham
English cricketers
Nottinghamshire Cricket Board cricketers
Nottinghamshire cricketers
Leicestershire cricketers